Daniel Olin, is a Finland Swedish talk show produced and broadcast by Finland's national public broadcast company Yle from 2019 to 2022. In the talk show, the host Daniel Olin is visited by a well-known and socially significant person. The conversation focuses on the guest's life, career and personal experiences. The first program was broadcast on 6 April 2019 and the last on 17 April 2022.

The program was nominated for a Golden Venla (in Finnish Kultainen Venla) for best talk show in 2019.

Episodes

References

External links  
 Daniel Olin on Yle Arenen (in Swedish)

Yle original programming
Finnish television shows
Swedish-language television shows
Finland-Swedish television shows
2010s Finnish television series
2020s Finnish television series